A number of steamships have been named Germania, including:-

, in service with Austrian-Lloyd 1847-73
, in service with Hamburg-Amerikanische Packetfarhrt Aktien-Gesellschaft 1856-78
, in service with Sveabolaget 1908-11
, in service with Hamburg-Amerikanische Packetfarhrt Aktien-Gesellschaft 1870-76 and Hamburg-Sudamerikanische Dampfschifffahrts-Gesellschaft in 1876
, in service with the Compagnie Francaise de Navigation a Vapeur Cyprien Fabre & Compagnie 1903-14
, in service with Svenska Lloyd 1908-17
, a Hansa A type cargo ship in service with Hellenic Lines 1954-55